Marion Jean Lewis  (born 1925 in Windsor, Ontario) is a Canadian medical researcher, known for her work on the Rh factor and on the Duffy antigen system.

Career
Lewis graduated from Winnipeg's Gordon Bell High School in 1943. She was trained as a medical technician at Winnipeg General Hospital. In 1944, the pediatric pathologist Bruce Chown, assisted by Lewis, opened the Rh Laboratory in Winnipeg to study and eradicate Rh disease. Their research led to effective treatments and a vaccine that prevents Rh disease.

In 1950–51, Lewis spent four months at an Italian university studying the Italian language and culture. She then spent another three months studying in London under world-renowned ‘blood groupers’ Robert Race and Ruth Sanger. In 1951, she returned to Winnipeg and the Rh lab. From 1952 and 1960, Chown and Lewis made annual trips, visiting Canadian tribal groups, including the Blackfoot and Cree, to test their blood for Rh factors. They also tested Inuit at Kugluktuk and Southampton Island and Hutterites in Manitoba.

While Chown retired in 1977, Lewis continued on in the field of blood group gene mapping and eventually branched out into the field of genetics. She and her colleagues at the Rh Laboratory, including Hiroko Kaita, became internationally renowned for their work.

In the Department of Pediatrics at the University of Manitoba's the Faculty of Medicine, Lewis was an assistant professor from 1973 to 1977, an associate professor from 1977 to 1984, and a full professor from 1984 to 1996, when she retired as professor emerita. She is the author or co-author of more than 140 articles.

On 27 June 2019, Lewis was appointed as an Officer to the Order of Canada for her contributions to the prevention and treatment of Rh disease. In 2020, Lewis was appointed as a member of the Order of Manitoba.

Awards and honours
 1971 — Karl Landsteiner Memorial Award of the American Association of Blood Banks (AABB)
 1986 — honorary D.Sc. from the University of Winnipeg
 1993 — election as a Fellow of the Royal Society of Canada
 1996 — Emily Cooley Memorial Award of the AABB
 2019 — Officer of the Order of Canada
 2020 — Member of the Order of Manitoba

References

1925 births
Living people
Canadian women biologists
Fellows of the Royal Society of Canada
Officers of the Order of Canada
Members of the Order of Manitoba
People from Windsor, Ontario
University of Manitoba alumni
Academic staff of the University of Manitoba
20th-century Canadian women scientists
21st-century Canadian women scientists
20th-century Canadian biologists
21st-century Canadian biologists